Football Club Victoria Rosport is a football club based in Rosport, eastern Luxembourg.

In 2005, Rosport met IFK Göteborg in the first round of the Intertoto Cup. Because Rosport's stadium was not up to UEFA standards, the match was played at Stade Josy Barthel, the stadium of the Luxembourg national team.

Current squad

External links
 Victoria Rosport official website
 football-lineups

Victoria Rosport
Rosport
Victoria Rosport
1928 establishments in Luxembourg